The mountain pine beetle (Dendroctonus ponderosae) is a species of bark beetle native to the forests of western North America from Mexico to central British Columbia.

The outbreak in the Rocky Mountain National Park in Colorado began in 1996 and has caused the destruction of millions of acres/hectares of ponderosa and lodgepole pine trees. The outbreak then declined due to better environmental conditions and the fact that many vulnerable trees had been already destroyed.

Mountain pine beetles inhabit ponderosa, whitebark, lodgepole, Scots, jack, limber, Rocky Mountain bristlecone, and Great Basin bristlecone pine trees. Normally, these insects play an important role in the life of a forest, attacking old or weakened trees, and speeding development of a younger forest. However, unusually hot, dry summers and mild winters in 2004–2007 throughout the United States and Canada, along with forests filled with mature lodgepole pine, led to an unprecedented epidemic.

The outbreak may have been the largest forest insect blight seen in North America since European colonization. Monocultural replanting, and a century of forest fire suppression have contributed to the size and severity of the outbreak, and the outbreak itself may, with similar infestations, have significant effects on the capability of northern forests to remove greenhouse gases (such as CO2) from the atmosphere.

Because of its impact on forestry, the transcriptome and the genome of the beetle have been sequenced. It was the second beetle genome to be sequenced.

Tree infestations 

Mountain pine beetles affect pine trees by laying eggs under the bark. The beetles introduce blue stain fungus into the sapwood that prevents the tree from repelling and killing the attacking beetles with tree pitch flow. The fungus also blocks water and nutrient transport within the tree. On the tree exterior, this results in popcorn-shaped masses of resin, called "pitch tubes", where the beetles have entered. The joint action of larval feeding and fungal colonization kills the host tree within a few weeks of successful attack (the fungus and feeding by the larvae girdles the tree, cutting off the flow of water and nutrients). In recent years, drought conditions have further weakened trees, making them more vulnerable and unable to defend against attack. When the tree is first attacked, it remains green. Usually within a year of attack, the needles will have turned red. This means the tree is dying or dead, and the beetles have moved to another tree. In three to four years after the attack, very little foliage is left, so the trees appear grey.

As beetle populations increase or more trees become stressed because of drought or other causes, the population may quickly increase and spread. Healthy trees are then attacked, and huge areas of mature pine stands may be threatened or killed. Warm summers and mild winters play a role in both insect survival and the continuation and intensification of an outbreak. Adverse weather conditions (such as winter lows of -40°) can reduce the beetle populations and slow the spread, but the insects can recover quickly and resume their attack on otherwise healthy forests.

Life cycle

Beetles develop through four stages: egg, larva, pupa and adult. Except for a few days during the summer when adults emerge from brood trees and fly to attack new host trees, all life stages are spent beneath the bark.

In low elevation stands and in warm years, mountain pine beetles require one year to complete a generation. At high elevations, where summers are typically cooler, life cycles may vary from one to two years

Female beetles initiate attacks. As they chew into the inner bark and phloem, pheromones are released, attracting male and female beetles to the same tree. The attacking beetles produce more pheromones, resulting in a mass attack that overcomes the tree's defenses, and results in attacks on adjacent trees.

Natural predators of the mountain pine beetle include certain birds, particularly woodpeckers, and various insects.

Management techniques 
Management techniques include harvesting at the leading edges of what is known as "green attack", as well as other techniques that can be used to manage infestations on a smaller scale, including:
 Pheromone baiting – is luring beetles into trees 'baited' with a synthetic hormone that mimics the scent of a female beetle. Beetles can then be contained in a single area, where they can more easily be destroyed.
 Sanitation harvesting – is removing single infested trees to control the spread of beetle populations to other areas.
 Snip and skid – is removing groups of infested trees scattered over a large area.
Controlled, or mosaic, burning – is burning an area where infested trees are concentrated, to reduce high beetle infestations in the area or to help reduce the fire hazard in an area. Controlling wildfires has significantly increased since the 1980s and '90s due to firefighting technology.
 Fall and burn – is cutting (felling) and burning beetle-infested trees to prevent the spread of beetle populations to other areas. This is usually done in winter, to reduce the risk of starting forest fires.
 Pesticides – Biopesticides such as chitosan have been tested for protection against the mountain pine beetle, and pesticides such as carbaryl, permethrin, and bifenthrin are used for smaller area applications.

The concept of natural plant defense holds hope for eliminating pine beetle infestation. Beneficial microbial solutions are being researched and developed that work with the plant to activate and enhance its resistance mechanisms against insects and disease.

The US Forest Service tested chitosan, a biopesticide, to pre-arm pine trees to defend themselves against MPB. The US Forest Service results show colloidal chitosan elicited a 40% increase in pine resin (P<0.05) in southern pine trees. One milliliter chitosan per 10 gallons water was applied to the ground area within the drip ring of loblolly pine trees. The application was repeated three times from May through September in 2008. The chitosan was responsible for eliciting natural defense responses of increased resin pitch-outs, with the ability to destroy 37% of the pine beetle eggs.
Dr. Jim Linden, Microbiologist, Colorado State University, stated the chitosan increased resin pitch-outs to push the mountain pine beetle out of the tree, preventing the MPB from entering the pine tree and spreading blue stain mold.

Aggressively searching out, removing, and destroying the brood in infested trees is the best way to slow the spread of mountain pine beetles; however, it may not protect specific trees. Spraying trees to prevent attack is the most effective way to protect a small number of high-value trees from mountain pine beetles. Carbaryl, permethrin and bifenthrin are registered in the United States for use in the prevention of pine beetle infestations. Carbaryl is considered by the EPA to likely be carcinogenic to humans. It is moderately toxic to wild birds and partially to highly toxic to aquatic organisms. Permethrin is easily metabolized in mammalian livers, so is less dangerous to humans. Birds are also practically not affected by permethrin. Negative effects can be seen in aquatic ecosystems, as well as it being very toxic to beneficial insects. Bifenthrin is moderately dangerous to mammals, including humans; it is slightly more toxic to birds and aquatic ecosystems than permethrin, as well as extremely toxic to beneficial insects.

Colorado's forests are densely wooded, making them much more susceptible to bark beetle attack. Current legislation is in place to help with the growing beetle problem. Colorado Senators Mark Udall and Michael Bennet announced that Colorado will receive $30 million of the $40 million being diverted by the U.S. Forest Service to fight the millions of acres of damage caused by the mountain pine beetle in the Rocky Mountain region.

Fall and burn is the technique being used in Alberta where there is hope of limiting the outbreak to western Canada, preventing its spread to northern Saskatchewan and further towards eastern Canada where jack pine may be vulnerable as far east as Nova Scotia.

Commercial use of affected trees

Timber quality
Wood from beetle-affected trees retains its commercial usefulness for 8 to 12 years after the tree has died, but its value drops rapidly, for within several months, the escaping moisture blows large checks and cracks from the outer perimeter of the wood deep into the heart of the tree. The remaining moisture escapes more slowly, causing small cracks throughout the timber. This causes difficulties for modern high-output automated sawmill operations and greatly increases the lumber losses and the labor to produce high quality wood products. This so-called 'shelf life' is dependent on a number of factors, including economic and stand site conditions. In areas where it is wetter, the trees tend to rot at the base and fall faster, especially if they are larger. The fungus that is carried by the beetles and kills the trees causes blue staining of the sapwood at the perimeter of the tree, but it does not affect the wood's strength, nor are there any harmful human health effects. Blue stain is, however, considered to be a defect in the lumber grading standards and thus is considered a 'down-grade' resulting in a lower commodity market price. All these factors have severely limited the production of blue-stain wood products.

Timber uses

The timber can be used for any wood product from standard framing lumber to engineered wood products, such as glue-laminated products and cross-laminated panels. The epidemic in British Columbia is also creating opportunities for the emerging bio-energy industry. Though there are many small wood working and craft shops that are making furniture and crafts out of the exotic appearing blue-stained wood, and despite the massive supply and the increasingly apparent need to utilize this dead timber, there are very few companies that have created product lines that require large volumes of dead trees. This is largely due to the significant difficulties and increased expense inherent to processing dead timber, and the correspondingly lowered profitability. Blue-stained pine is now available at some big box stores like Lowe's.

Biofuel/alternative energy production from beetle-killed trees
There has been concern that the huge number of beetle-killed trees may pose a risk of devastating forest fires. Forest thinning to mitigate fire danger is expensive and resource-intensive. Attention is turning to ways to turn this liability into a source of cellulosic ethanol.

Leaders in western U.S. states and Canadian provinces have promoted legislation to provide incentives for companies using beetle-killed trees for biofuel or biopower applications. Sellable commodities resulting from MPB damage can help subsidize the cost of forest thinning projects and support new job markets. Colorado's Department of Energy recently provided $30 million toward construction of the state's first cellulosic ethanol plant, to convert beetle kill into ethanol. Lignin, a byproduct of the process, can be sold for applications in lubricants and other goods.

Fire hazards
The long-held belief that beetle infestations and resulting deadkill lead to more devastating forest fires is currently being challenged. Although some disagree, ongoing NASA studies have shown beetle kill may actually reduce available small fuels and consequently limit the effect and reach of fires.

Current outbreak

The current outbreak of mountain pine beetles is ten times larger than previous outbreaks.
Under the presumption that the large areas of dead pine stands represent a potential fire hazard, the BC government is directing fuel management activities in beetle areas as recommended in the 2003 Firestorm Provincial Review. Harvesting affected stands aids fire management by removing the presumed hazard and breaking the continuity of the fuels.
These fuel management treatments are specifically designed to reduce interface fire threats to communities and Native Americans located in the infestation zone. The interface is the area where urban development and wilderness meet.

As of May 2013, the Pine Beetle is aggressively devastating forests in all 19 US-American western states and Canada, destroying approximately 88 million acres of timber at a 70–90% kill rate. Over 13,000 miles of power lines are being endangered with falling trees that increasingly raise the risk of fires that could cause widespread problems for millions of people. The US Forest Service is working on a hazard tree removal strategy, prioritizing high-use recreation areas, such as campgrounds, roads and National Forest Service lands adjacent to vulnerable public infrastructures such as power lines and near communities.

Previously, cold spells had killed off bark beetles which are now attacking the forests. The longer breeding season is another factor encouraging beetle proliferation. The combination of warmer weather, attack by beetles, and mismanagement during past years has led to a substantial increase in the severity of forest fires in Montana. According to a study done for the U.S. Environmental Protection Agency by the Harvard School of Engineering and Applied Science, portions of Montana will experience a 200% increase in area burned by wildland fires, and an 80% increase in air pollution from those fires.

Effect on the carbon cycle 
Researchers from the Canadian Forest Service have studied the relationship between the carbon cycle and forest fires, logging and tree deaths. They concluded by 2020, the pine beetle outbreak will have released 270 megatonnes of carbon dioxide into the atmosphere from Canadian forests. There is yet to be an accepted study of the carbon cycle effect over a future period of time for North American forests, but scientists believe we are at a 'tipping point' of our Western Forests becoming a source of carbon off-put that is greater than that of a 'carbon sink'. Other scientists say that this "tipping point" will reverse itself as new forest life is established. This new growth will remove more carbon dioxide than the mature trees they are replacing would have.
According to a 2016 study from the Pacific Institute for Climate Solutions rising levels of carbon dioxide may cancel out the pine beetle impact in British Columbia by 2020. The fertilization effect of the increased CO2 levels has returned BC forests to a carbon sink as of 2016 per Werner Kurz of the Canadian Forest Service.

Effect on water resources 
Hydrologists from the University of Colorado have investigated the impacts of beetle-infested forests on the water cycle, in particular, snow accumulation and melt. They concluded that dead forests will accumulate more snowpack as a result of thinner tree canopies and decreased snow sublimation. These thinned canopies also cause faster snowmelt by allowing more sunlight through to the forest floor and lowering the snowpack albedo, as a result of needle litter on the snow surface. Augmented snowpack coupled with dead trees that no longer transpire will likely lead to more available water.

See also
Beetle kill in Colorado
Rocky Mountain bark beetle infestation
Biopesticide
Chitosan
Global warming
United States Forest Service

References

External links

Death and Rebirth, Mountain Pine Beetle, Pesticides, Carcinogens, Cancer -David Chernoff, Manual For Living
The Falldown Documentary- A look at the devastating impact of the beetle on British Columbia and Canada's Economy
Trees targeted by beetle

Beetles described in 1902
Beetles of North America
Climate change in Canada
Scolytinae
Effects of climate change
Environmental disasters in Canada
Insect pests of temperate forests
Woodboring beetles
Articles containing video clips
Environmental issues in Alberta